John Ferrillo is an American oboist. He has been the Principal Oboe of the Boston Symphony Orchestra since 2001. He is also member at the Tanglewood Music Center.  Prior to these posts, he was Co-Principal Oboe of the Metropolitan Opera Orchestra in New York from 1986 to 2001 as well as a former teacher at the Juilliard School and Mannes School of Music.  Ferrillo studied with John de Lancie at the Curtis Institute of Music.

References

Year of birth missing (living people)
American classical oboists
American oboists
Male oboists
Juilliard School faculty
New England Conservatory faculty
Boston University faculty
Living people
Place of birth missing (living people)